Fracture is an Internet-based photo finishing service.  Fracture's main service is printing photos directly onto glass.  The company is based in Gainesville, Florida.

History

A startup company in North Central Florida, Fracture was founded by two graduates of The University of Florida, Alex Theodore and Abhi Lokesh. They began selling their product in December 2009.  Theodore and Lokesh raised $1.5 million in funding from outside investors, including Tamiami Angel Fund I in 2012.

In 2011, after a Groupon promotion, sales increased significantly, and the company moved to a larger building and had ten employees. In 2013 the company raised an additional $500,000 to pay for further expansion.

By 2014, the company had filled about 50,000 orders.

By July 2015, the company had filled over 100,000 orders.

Features 
Customers upload photos through the company's website and get back those photos printed on a pane of shatter resistant glass.

See also 

Photo printing

References

External links 

 FractureMe.com
 WCJB – TV 20 “Technology Spotlight”, August 31, 2010
 Foundora “Abhi Lokesh, Co-Founder of Fracture, Shares His Startup Story, His Lessons Learnt & Speaks About Challenges of Tangible Product Startups”, February 14, 2011
 Daily Grommet “Fracture: Images on Glass”, May 31, 2011

American photography websites
Companies based in Gainesville, Florida